Pierre Marie Jeanne Alexandre Thérèse Guiraud better known as Alexandre Guiraud (24 December 1788 – 24 February 1847) was a French poet, dramatic author and novelist.

Biography
Guiraud was born in Limoux, Aude, the son of a rich cloth merchant. He studied at the École de droit de Toulouse where he created a "Gymnase littéraire".  He made frequent trips to Paris where the success of his poetry opened the doors to the Académie française to which he was elected against Alphonse de Lamartine in 1826.  He was named Baron by Charles X in 1827 in reward for his contribution to the opera Pharamond.  He was the author of many elegiac poems as well as tragedies and novels.  He died in Paris.

Works 
Élégies savoyardes (1822)
Les Machabées, ou le Martyre, tragédie en 5 actes, Paris, Théâtre de l'Odéon, 14 June 1822
Le Comte Julien, ou l'Expiation, tragédie en 5 actes, Paris, Théâtre de l'Odéon, 12 April 1823
Cadix ou la délivrance de l'Espagne (1823)
Chants hellènes, Byron, Ipsara (1824)
Poèmes et chants élégiaques (1824)
Pharamond, poème de MM. Ancelot, Guiraud, et Soumet, musique de MM. Boieldieu, Berton et Kreutzer, Paris, Académie royale de musique, 10 June 1825
Le Prêtre (1826)
Virginie, tragédie en 5 actes et en vers, Paris, Théâtre-Français, 28 April 1827
Césaire, révélation (2 vol.) (1830)
La Communion du duc de Bordeaux (1832)
Les Deux Princes (1832)
De la Vérité dans le système représentatif (1834)
Flavien, ou De Rome au désert (3 vol.) (1835)
Poésies dédiées à la jeunesse (1836)
Philosophie catholique de l'histoire, ou l'Histoire expliquée ; introduction renfermant l'histoire de la création universelle (3 vol.) (1839–41)
Le Cloître de Villemartin, poésie (1843)
Œuvres complètes (4 vol.) (1845)

References 
 Alexandre Guiraud. (2007, février 25). Wikipedia, l'encyclopédie libre. Page consultée le 17:55, mars 30, 2007 à partir de .

External links 
 Page Biography 
 Biography of the Académie française 

1788 births
1847 deaths
People from Limoux
19th-century French poets
19th-century French dramatists and playwrights
Members of the Académie Française
French male poets
19th-century French male writers